Rhinotyphlops boylei, commonly known as Boyle's beaked blind snake, is a species of snake in the family Typhlopidae. The species is native to southern Africa.

Etymology
The specific name, boylei, is in honor of "A. M. Boyle, Esq.", who collected the holotype.

Geographic range
Indigenous to southern Africa, R. boylei is found from Damaraland in Namibia to western Botswana.

Description
Dorsally, R. boylei is olive-brown, the scales light-edged. Ventrally, it is pale yellow.

The scales are arranged in 26-28 rows around the body. There are more than 300 dorsal scales in the vertebral row.

Habitat

Reproduction
R. boylei is oviparous.

References

Further reading
Broadley DG, Wallach V (2009). "A review of the eastern and southern African blind-snakes (Serpentes: Typhlopidae), excluding Letheobia Cope, with the description of two new genera and a new species". Zootaxa 2255: 1–100. (Rhinotyphlops boylei, p. 59).
FitzSimons V (1932). "Preliminary descriptions of new forms of South African Reptilia and Amphibia, from the Vernay-Lang Kalahari Expedition, 1930". Annals of the Transvaal Museum 15 (1): 35–40. (Typhlops boylei, new species).
FitzSimons V (1966). "A check-list, with syntopic keys, to the snakes of southern Africa". Ann. Transvaal Mus. 25 (3): 35–79.

Typhlopidae
Taxa named by Vivian Frederick Maynard FitzSimons
Reptiles described in 1932